The 1955 National Challenge Cup was the 42nd edition of the United States Soccer Football Association's annual open soccer championship.

External links
 1955 National Challenge Cup – TheCup.us

Lamar Hunt U.S. Open Cup
U.S. Open Cup